The 2019 Challenger de Buenos Aires was a professional tennis tournament played on clay courts. It was the ninth edition of the tournament which was part of the 2019 ATP Challenger Tour. It took place in Buenos Aires, Argentina between 23 and 29 September 2019.

Singles main-draw entrants

Seeds

 1 Rankings are as of September 16, 2019.

Other entrants
The following players received wildcards into the singles main draw:
  Sebastián Báez
  Román Andrés Burruchaga
  Juan Manuel Cerúndolo
  Facundo Díaz Acosta
  Thiago Agustín Tirante

The following player received entry into the singles main draw as an alternate:
  Rafael Matos

The following players received entry from the qualifying draw:
  Tomás Farjat
  Federico Zeballos

Champions

Singles

  Sumit Nagal def.  Facundo Bagnis 6–4, 6–2.

Doubles

  Guido Andreozzi /  Andrés Molteni def.  Hugo Dellien /  Federico Zeballos 6–7(3–7), 6–2, [10–1].

References

2019 ATP Challenger Tour
2019
2019 in Argentine sport
September 2019 sports events in South America